This is a list of professional sports teams in Delaware.

References

Delaware

Professional sports teams